These are the results of the men's K-1 slalom competition in canoeing at the 1972 Summer Olympics. The K-1 (kayak single) event is raced by one-man kayaks through a whitewater course.  The venue for the 1972 Olympic competition was in Augsburg.

Medalists

Results
The 37 competitors each took two runs through the whitewater slalom course on August 28. The best time of the two runs counted for the event.

References

1972 Summer Olympics official report Volume 3. p. 497. 
Sports-reference.com 1972 men's K-1 slalom results.

Men's Slalom K-1
Men's events at the 1972 Summer Olympics